Count Charles-François Gaston Louis Prosper de Chasseloup-Laubat (7 June 1866 – 20 November 1903) was a French aristocrat and race car driver.

Biography

Born in Paris, he was the son of Prosper, Marquis of Chasseloup-Laubat, minister of the Navy under Napoleon III, and the American Marie-Louise Pilié. 

He is known for setting the first recognised automobile land speed record on 18 December 1898, in Achères, Yvelines, using a Jeantaud electric car. The record was set as part of a competition organised by the French automobile magazine La France Automobile.

He further improved this record to  one month later on 17 January 1899, also at Achères, in the first of a series of record setting duels with Camille Jenatzy.

Chasseloup-Laubat managed to win the Marseille-La Turbie long-distance race in 1897 with a steam vehicle built by Trépardoux & Cie, predecessor of De Dion-Bouton. This was the only major city-to-city event won by a steam car.

The Count died in Le Cannet, near Cannes, aged 37, after a two-year long illness.

References 

1866 births
1903 deaths
Counts of France
French nobility
French people of American descent
Land speed record people
French racing drivers
1890s in motorsport
People from Paris